Verticillitidae is a family of sponges belonging to the order Dictyoceratida.

Genera

Genera:
 Cinnabaria Senowbari-Daryan, 1990
 Cryptocoelia Steinmann, 1882
 Cryptocoeliopsis Wilckens, 1937

References

Dictyoceratida
Sponge families